Fourteen or 14 may refer to:
 14 (number), the natural number following 13 and preceding 15
 one of the years 14 BC, AD 14, 1914, 2014

Music
 14th (band), a British electronic music duo
 14 (David Garrett album), 2013
14, an unreleased album by Charli XCX
 "14" (song), 2007, from Courage by Paula Cole

Other uses
 Fourteen (film), a 2019 American film directed by Dan Sallitt
 Fourteen (play), a 1919 play by Alice Gerstenberg
 Fourteen (manga), a 1990 manga series by Kazuo Umezu
 14 (novel), a 2013 science fiction novel by Peter Clines
 The 14, a 1973 British drama film directed by David Hemmings
 Fourteen, West Virginia, United States, an unincorporated community
 Lot Fourteen, redevelopment site in Adelaide, South Australia, previously occupied by the Royal Adelaide Hospital
 "The Fourteen", a nickname for NASA Astronaut Group 3
 Fourteen Words, a phrase used by white supremacists and Nazis

See also
 1/4 (disambiguation)
 Fourteener, a high peak in United States mountains
 Fourteener (poetry), a line of 14 syllables
 Fourteen 14, an Italian Eurodance project
 List of highways numbered 14